The 2022-2023 Israeli Basketball National League will be the 24th season as second tier since its re-alignment in 2000 and the 69th season of second-tier basketball in Israel.

Teams
The following teams have changed division since the 2021–2022 season.

To Liga Leumit
Promoted from Liga Artzit
Elitzur Shomron (North Division)
Maccabi Rehovot (South Division)

Relegated from Premier League
 Maccabi Rishon LeZion

From Liga Leumit
Promoted to Premier League
Ironi Kiryat Ata

Relegated to Liga Artzit
Maccabi Hod HaSharon 
Maccabi Ashdod 
Hapoel Migdal HaEmek/Jezreel

Venues and locations

Regular season

League table

Rounds 1 to 26

Awards

MVP of the Round

References

Israeli
Basketball